La Roche-sur-Yon is a commune in the Vendée department in the Pays de la Loire region in western France. It is the capital of the department. The demonym for its inhabitants is Yonnais.

History
The town expanded significantly after Napoleon I chose the site as the new préfecture of the Vendée on 25 May 1804, replacing Fontenay-le-Comte (then under its revolutionary name of Fontenay-le-Peuple). At the time, most of La Roche had been eradicated in the Vendée Revolt (1793–96); the renamed Napoléonville was laid out and a fresh population of soldiers and civil servants was brought in. Napoléonville was designed to accommodate 15,000 people.

The town was called successively:
La Roche-sur-Yon (during the Ancien Régime and the French First Republic)
Napoléon-sur-Yon (during the First French Empire)
Bourbon-Vendée (during the French Restoration)
Napoléon-Vendée (during the French Second Empire)

Geography
The river Yon flows southward through the commune and crosses the town.

Climate

La Roche-sur-Yon has a oceanic climate (Köppen climate classification Cfb).

Population

The population data in the table and graph below refer to the commune of La Roche-sur-Yon proper, in its geography at the given years. The commune of La Roche-sur-Yon absorbed the former communes of Le Bourg-sous-la-Roche-sur-Yon and Saint-André-d'Ornay in 1964.

Administration

The Communauté d'agglomération "La Roche-sur-Yon Agglomération" contains 15 communes:
Aubigny
Chaillé-sous-les-Ormeaux
La Chaize-le-Vicomte
Les Clouzeaux
Dompierre-sur-Yon
La Ferrière
Fougeré
Landeronde
Mouilleron-le-Captif
Nesmy
La Roche-sur-Yon
Saint-Florent-des-Bois
Le Tablier
Thorigny
Venansault

La Roche-sur-Yon is the chief town of the Arrondissement of La Roche-sur-Yon, which covers 11 cantons, 92 communes, and has a population of 230,386 (1999 census).

La-Roche-sur-Yon is chief town of two cantons, Canton of La Roche-sur-Yon-1 and Canton of La Roche-sur-Yon-2.

Main sights

Transport

The Gare de La Roche-sur-Yon railway station offers connections to Nantes, Paris, Les Sables-d'Olonne, Bordeaux and several regional destinations. The A87 motorway connects La Roche-sur-Yon with Les Sables-d'Olonne and Angers, the A83 with Nantes and Niort.

Education
The commune has designated attendance zones for its primary schools.

Schools include:
2 public preschools (écoles maternelles)
2 public elementary schools
13 public school groups of combined preschools and elementary schools
6 private elementary schools
Public junior high schools: Collège Auguste et Jean-Renoir, Collège mixte Les Gondoliers, Collège mixte Edouard Herriot, Collège Haxo
Private junior high schools: Collège mixte du Sacré-Coeur, Collège mixte Richelieu, Collège mixte Saint-Louis
Public senior high schools: Lycée Nature (general education and agricultural technology), Lycée d'état mixte Alfred-Kastler, Lycée polyvalent Jean de Lattre-de-Tassigny, Lycée polyvalent Pierre-Mendès-France, and Lycée professionnel Edoaurd Branly
Private senior high schools: Lycée Saint-François d'Assise, Lycée d'enseignement général et technologique Notre-Dame-du-Roc, Lycée les Etablières
One grande école : Institut catholique d'arts et métiers

Sports
In 2014 La Roche-sur-yon hosted the 2014 French championship of table tennis

La Roche-sur-Yon's Vendéspace hosted one of the first round ties of the 2014 Davis Cup tennis tournament over the weekend of 31 January - 2 February 2014. France hosted Australia as both teams competed for a place in the World Group quarterfinals.

In 2015 La Roche-sur-Yon, will host the 2015 FIRS Men's Roller Hockey World Cup, the first time that a World Cup of roller hockey is held in France.

In June 2015 La Roche-sur-Yon's Vendéspace will host the qualification tournament for the World Championships in Savate Combat

Twin towns – sister cities
La Roche-sur-Yon is twinned with:
 Gummersbach, Germany
 Coleraine, Northern Ireland, United Kingdom
 Drummondville, Canada
 Cáceres, Spain, since 1982
 Tizi Ouzou, Algeria, since 1989
 Burg bei Magdeburg, Germany, since 2005
 Broomhedge, Northern Ireland, United Kingdom, since 2021

Notable people
 Joséphine Colomb (1833-1892), children's writer, lyricist, translator
 Ciryl Gane (born 1990), mixed martial artist, former UFC Interim Heavyweight Champion
 Adlène Guedioura (born 1985), Algerian former professional footballer
 Thomas Laurent (born 1998), racing driver

See also
Communes of the Vendée department

References

External links

 Official website 

Communes of Vendée
Prefectures in France
Poitou